The Hotel Cortez is a historic eleven-story building in El Paso, Texas. It was built as Hotel Orndorff for Alzina Orndorff DeGroff in 1926, and it was designed by Trost & Trost. It cost $1.4 million to build.  Mrs. DeGroff unexpectedly died one month before its completion.  It was purchased by the Hussman Hotel Company in 1933, and they renamed it as Hotel Cortez in 1935. It closed down in 1970, and it was remodelled into offices in 1984. It has been listed on the National Register of Historic Places since September 24, 1980.

President John F. Kennedy stayed overnight on June 5, 1963.  In 1970 it began hosting the El Paso Job Corps Center, by lease with the Department of Labor.

References

Hotel buildings completed in 1926
Buildings and structures in El Paso, Texas
National Register of Historic Places in El Paso County, Texas
Renaissance Revival architecture in Texas
Trost & Trost buildings